Clinton Commercial Historic District is a national historic district located at Clinton, Laurens County, South Carolina.  It encompasses 37 contributing buildings in the central business district of Clinton.   The district predominantly comprises late-19th and early-20th century commercial buildings, and also contains two bank buildings; a five-section warehouse; a former city hall; a large, industrial building; a Masonic temple; and a small, landscaped park.

It was listed on the National Register of Historic Places in 1984.

References

Commercial buildings on the National Register of Historic Places in South Carolina
Historic districts on the National Register of Historic Places in South Carolina
Buildings and structures in Laurens County, South Carolina
National Register of Historic Places in Laurens County, South Carolina